Marquess of Guadalcanal  is a hereditary  title of Spanish nobility. It was created on 11 July 2008 by King Juan Carlos I of Spain in favor of Antonio Fontán Pérez, journalist and politician.

List of Holders
 Antonio Fontán Pérez, 1st Marquess of Guadalcanal (2008–2010)
 Eugenio Fontán Pérez, 2nd Marquess of Guadalcanal (2012–2017)
 María Teresa Fontán Oñate, 3rd Marchioness of Guadalcanal (2018– )

References

Marquessates in the Spanish nobility
Noble titles created in 2008